IAFP may represent:

International Academy of Family Psychology
Institute of Advanced Financial Planners
International Association of Flight Paramedics
International Association for Food Protection
International Association for Forensic Psychotherapy